Reyes Airport ,  is an airport serving Reyes, the capital of the José Ballivián Province in Bolivia's Beni Department.

The Reyes non-directional beacon (Ident: REY) is located on the field.

See also

Transport in Bolivia
List of airports in Bolivia

References

External links 
OpenStreetMap - Reyes
OurAirports - Reyes
SkyVector - Reyes
Fallingrain - Reyes Airport

Airports in Beni Department